Eloïne Barry is a communications professional and founder of African Media Agency.

Early life 

Eloïne Barry was born and raise in Lyon, France, in 1981 to a Senegalese mother and a father who hails from Guinea-Bissau.

She graduated in 2003 with a Bachelor in Arts in English Literature from Université Lyon 2 and a Degree in Translation and International Relations from ESTRI, she then graduated in 2005 with a Masters in Communications from EFAP Lyon.

Career at PR agencies

PR Newswire 
Barry's first job out of university was with PR Newswire as a Media Relations Executive. Being fluent in French and German, she was responsible for promoting PR Newswire content and products to general media and trade publications in France and the DACH region in both French and German and acted as point of contact for the French and German media. In her role, Barry supported the French sales team by ensuring presence of key media in any distribution offered to PR Newswire clients.

Barry got promoted to Media Relations Team Leader one year after joining PR Newswire and managed a team of eight Media Relations Executives both in-house and off-site, which were accountable for the Europe, Middle East, Africa and India (EMEAi) region. In her role, Barry was responsible for increasing the value of PR Newswire distribution services by delivering superior results. This included expanding the audience that received or accessed content, increasing the engagement of the various audiences and providing richer data about these audiences to PR Newswire clients.

She organised a series of ‘Meet the Media’ events, with reporters from the Economist, the Guardian, the FT, the Times, giving talks to PR professionals on PR best practice and developed robust relationships with sector specific news circuits and publications, resulting in increased coverage for PR Newswire clients.

African Press Organization 
Barry joined African Press Organization as its executive director when it was an NGO, providing services to African journalists, from press releases distribution to access to press conferences. Within the first year, she turned APO into the only commercial wire, disseminating press releases through different channels of distribution in the 54 states of the African continent. She implemented virtual press conferences solutions; increased revenue by 300%; recruited and managed a team of operations and project managers, sales executives, translators. She also arranged partnerships with the world's leaders in the information industry: Thomson Reuters, Bloomberg, DowJones Factiva and Lexis Nexis.

African Media Agency 
In 2015, Barry started African Media Agency (AMA) as a response to the growing need of companies operating in the African context for more engagements, guidance and strategy. She hired a team and opened offices in Abidjan, Kampala and set-up on the ground operations in Cairo, Casablanca, Dakar, Kigali, Nairobi, Johannesburg and Lagos. Her team understands the diversified and often complex cultural, political and socio-economic environment in which the agency operates, making AMA the media partner of choice for any company operating on the continent. Within five years, AMA has helped many of the largest, most respected organizations and companies in the world grow their share of voice beyond mere headlines and make a significant difference to the impact of their work on the continent.

AMA has run projects in over 35 countries, has over 80 clients, speaks 14 languages and has received over 30,000 pieces of coverage from the leading local, regional and pan-African publications to the most important International media including CNN, The Economist, The Guardian.

Awards & Nominations 
Eloine Barry was recognized as one of the Most influential People of African Descent (MIPAD) in 2018[1].

She received the Prize of Excellence awards by ASCOM in 2019 and was nominated for two consecutive years by New African Women, Women of the year in the Media category.

She sits on the board of Africa Communications Week[2] and has volunteered for Speak Up Africa.

References

 Most Influential People of African Descent 2018 - Media & Culture Category, retrieved July 16, 2019
 Africa Communications Week, Top 30 African Communications Professionals to follow, retrieved July 16, 2019

Senegalese businesspeople
Living people
Senegalese journalists
Guinean journalists
Guinean expatriates in Senegal
Senegalese women journalists
Guinean women journalists
Year of birth missing (living people)